Jackie Winters (April 15, 1937 – May 29, 2019) was an American Republican politician in the U.S. state of Oregon. She served as a state senator, representing the 10th district in Salem. She was Senate Minority Leader. She died of lung cancer on May 29, 2019.

Early life 

Jackie Winters began her lifelong interest in citizen involvement in public policy as she listened to her parents’ discussions around the table, first in Topeka, Kansas where she was born, and later in Portland, Oregon where her family moved in 1943.  She attended Portland Public Schools and continued her education through the Oregon State University System’s Continuing Education coursework, with an emphasis on Intergovernmental Relations.

She began her governmental service in 1959 at University of Oregon Medical School in the medical records unit and later joined the staff of the Portland Model Cities Program.  In 1969 she was recruited to be supervisor of the Office of Economic Opportunity’s New Resources Program at the request of Governor Tom McCall.  In 1979 she was appointed Ombudsman by Governor Victor Atiyeh.  During this service, she helped create the Oregon Food Share Program, the first statewide non-profit food sharing network, which continues today serving most of Oregon’s neediest families.

In 1985, Winters opened her first Jackie’s Ribs restaurant, in Salem. Over time, she and her family expanded operations to include three restaurants, two franchises, catering services, private parties and numerous appearances in national Bar-B-Q Cook-offs.

Political career 

Winters was elected to the Oregon House of Representatives in 1998, and became the first African-American Republican ever to serve in the Oregon Legislative Assembly. She was re-elected to this office in 2000. Jackie Winters was elected to the Oregon State Senate in 2002. She won reelection in 2006, 2010, 2014 and again in 2018.

She ran for the U.S. Congress in 2004, losing in the Republican primary to Jim Zupancic, who went on to lose in the general election to incumbent Darlene Hooley.

On November 15, 2017, Winters was elected as Senate Minority Leader to replace Ted Ferrioli. She became the first black legislative leader in the state.

Legal dispute 
In 2018, Winters and the Home Owners Association she serves on was sued for violating the Fair Housing Act and Oregon's own fair housing laws. The HOA board Winters serves on allegedly contacted the Salem-Keizer School District and ordered the bus for a disabled girl to pick her up from a road outside the HOA subdivision instead of her home. When challenged by the girl's mother, the HOA banned buses from entering HOA subdivision entirely. Another family in the subdivision with a disabled child reportedly also had their child's bus service banned from the subdivision.

References

External links 
 Official State Senate biography
 Official campaign website
 

1937 births
2019 deaths
21st-century American politicians
21st-century American women politicians
African-American Christians
African-American state legislators in Oregon
African-American women in politics
American Protestants
Republican Party members of the Oregon House of Representatives
Republican Party Oregon state senators
Politicians from Salem, Oregon
Politicians from Topeka, Kansas
Portland Community College alumni
Women state legislators in Oregon
Deaths from lung cancer
Deaths from cancer in Oregon
Candidates in the 2004 United States elections
20th-century American politicians
20th-century American women politicians
20th-century African-American women
21st-century African-American women
21st-century African-American politicians
African-American history of Oregon